Petra Slakta (born 23 June 1989 in Heves) is a Hungarian handballer who plays for MTK Budapest in right back position.

Achievements
Nemzeti Bajnokság I:
Silver Medallist: 2008, 2011
Magyar Kupa:
Silver Medallist: 2008, 2011
EHF Cup:
Semifinalist: 2008

References

External links
 Petra Slakta player profile on Debreceni VSC Official Website
 Petra Slakta career statistics at Worldhandball

1989 births
Living people
Hungarian female handball players
People from Heves
Sportspeople from Heves County